The 2018 ICF Canoe Slalom World Championships were the 39th edition of the ICF Canoe Slalom World Championships. The event took place from 25 to 30 September 2018 in Rio de Janeiro, Brazil under the auspices of International Canoe Federation (ICF). The competitions were held at the Deodoro Olympic Whitewater Stadium which had also hosted the canoe slalom events of the 2016 Summer Olympics.

Brazil hosted the event for the third time after the 1997 championships in Três Coroas and the 2007 championships in Foz do Iguaçu.

It was the first World Championships not to feature the discontinued men's C2 event.

Russia and Argentina won their first ever medals at the Canoe Slalom World Championships. Host nation Brazil won their first ever gold medal.

Schedule
11 medal events were held.

All times listed are UTC-3.

Medal summary

Medal table

Men

Canoe

Kayak

Women

Canoe

Kayak

Mixed

Canoe
There were no heats for the Mixed C2 event. Only semifinal and final runs. The gate setup was the same as for the heats of the other individual events, but different from the setup used for the semifinals and finals of those events.

References

External links
International Canoe Federation

World Canoe Slalom Championships
ICF Canoe Slalom World Championships
2018 in Brazilian sport
ICF Canoe Slalom World Championships
International sports competitions in Rio de Janeiro (city)
Canoeing and kayaking competitions in Brazil